The Learning Station is an American educational children's musical group, comprising the husband-and-wife team Don and Laurie, and their friend Jan.

History and music career
Couple Laurie and Don Monopoli founded the group in Connecticut before moving to Melbourne, Florida in the late 1980s. At that time, Hrkach, who also partnered with Monopoli in a Brevard County recording studio, joined the group. The group has released several albums for years, and performed across the US. Group member Laurie Monopoli has an early childhood education degree, and develops the educational content of their concerts and recordings.

Releases

CDs
 Baby Shark and Festive Tunes (2020)
 A Bunch of Celebration Songs For Kids (2020)
 Nursery Rhymes with The Learning Station (2015)
 Brain Breaks Action Songs: Let's Move! (2014)
 Action! Fun! Dance! (2012)
 Preschool Learning Fun (2012)
 Children's Favorites Autumn Songs & Fingerplays (2011)
 #1 Best Kid's Songs! (2011)
 Kid's Country Song & Dance (2009)
 Brain Boogie Boosters (2008)
 You Can Dance! (2007)
 Literacy in Motion (2005)
 La Di Da, La Di Di, Dance With Me (2004)
 Get Funky and Musical Fun (2003)
 Seasonal Songs in Motion (2001)
 Physical Ed (2000)
 Sift and Splash (1999)
 Here We Go Loopty Loo (1998)
 Tony Chestnut & Fun Time Action Songs (1997)
 Rock 'N' Roll Songs That Teach (1997)
 All-Time Children's Favorites (1993, 1999)
 A Children's Christmas (1988)
 Play to Rest (1988, re-released in 2000)
 Children Love to Sing and Dance (1987, re-released in 2001)
 Singing, Moving and Fun (1987, re-released in 2001)

Videos and DVDs
 Movin' and Groovin''' (2000)
 It's Showtime! (2002)
 Physical Ed (2001)
 All Aboard With The Learning Station (1990)
 Brain Breaks Action Songs Vids for Kids (Volume 1)
 Brain Breaks Action Songs Vids for Kids (Volume 2)
 Brain Breaks Action Songs Vids for Kids (Volume 3)
 Brain Breaks Action Songs Vids for Kids (Volume 4)
 Music and Movement for Kids (2017)

DVDs and Blu-rays by 20th Century Fox/20th Century Studios
 Brain Breaks Action Songs Vids for Kids (Volume 5)
 Brain Breaks Action Songs Vids for Kids (Volume 6)

Books
 The Book About Tony Chestnut'' (2010)

References

External links
Official website

Musical groups established in 1987
American children's musical groups